The Columbia Club is a private club located on Monument Circle in downtown Indianapolis, Indiana. The current structure was built in 1925 as the club's third home on the same site.

Club history

The Columbia Club was originally formed on February 13, 1889, by a group of prominent local Republicans as the Harrison Marching Society as they had supported the presidential campaign of Benjamin Harrison. After the election, the Society acquired a clubhouse on Monument Circle and changed its name to the Columbia Club to continue operation as a private club. Quickly growing its membership, the Club evolved into the premier private club in Indianapolis.  The Club is no longer partisan and now numbers in its ranks a great many Democrats and members of other parties. According to the Club, the founders of the Indianapolis Motor Speedway (home of the Indianapolis 500) met there to discuss its construction.  In 1984, secret meetings were held there to negotiate the move of the Baltimore Colts to Indianapolis.

The Club has hosted every Republican president since Benjamin Harrison while in office or as a candidate and serves as temporary living quarters for many Indiana state legislators during the legislative session. In addition to the thousands of business leaders and politicians who have been members, the Club has also included many artists and musicians including Hoagy Carmichael and T.C. Steele.  It is located in the Washington Street-Monument Circle Historic District.

Building history

The current home of the Columbia Club was built on Monument Circle in 1925 by local architecture firm Rubush & Hunter. The club razed their five-story home built in 1898 for the current ten-story structure to accommodate their growing membership and popularity. A smaller club had existed on the site from 1889 to 1898. As one of the most prominent and architecturally significant buildings in downtown Indianapolis, the Columbia Club was added to the National Register of Historic Places in 1983.

Architectural features

The Columbia Club showcases many hallmarks of the Gothic Revival style, including a multi-story oriel window, as well as Tudor influences seen in the window arches. The building also features relief panels carved in Indiana Limestone by Alexander Sangernebo, who made limestone carvings for other historic buildings on Monument Circle.

Inside the Columbia Club are numerous works of Hoosier art and historic artifact, including items from the Benjamin Harrison presidential campaign and part of the Lincoln family china collection. After a 2004 acquisition of paintings from a longtime friendly rival, the Indianapolis Athletic Club, the Columbia Club added to its existing collection and now boasts a particularly large gallery of works by members of the Hoosier Group of painters, including T.C. Steele. According to Club lore, Steele would at times pay for his membership dues with paintings.

References

External links

Individually listed contributing properties to historic districts on the National Register in Indiana
Clubhouses on the National Register of Historic Places in Indiana
Gothic Revival architecture in Indiana
Buildings and structures completed in 1925
Buildings and structures in Indianapolis
National Register of Historic Places in Indianapolis